Morne Watt or Watt Mountain is a mountain consisting of one or more stratovolcanoes at the south end of Dominica in the eastern Caribbean Sea. The mountain is home to the Boiling Lake and Valley of Desolation thermal areas, both of which are the best-known volcanic features in Dominica and major tourist attractions in Morne Trois Pitons National Park.

Morne Watt was the source of a major eruption about 1,300 years ago that produced pyroclastic flows. This was followed by a smaller VEI-1 phreatic eruption in July 1997. The 1880 and 1997 explosions are the only historically confirmed Dominican eruptions.

See also
List of volcanoes in Dominica

References 

Mountains of Dominica
Volcanoes of Dominica
Holocene stratovolcanoes
Active volcanoes
Subduction volcanoes